Zyndram z Maszkowic (Zyndram of Maszkowice, c. 1355 – c. 1414) was a Polish 14th and 15th century knight. His coat of arms was Słońce.

Zyndram was first mentioned in 1388 as a mayor of Jasło. He bought the post from a certain Jakusz Trzop for 100 grzywnas. He was also the Sword-bearer of the Crown. In February 1390, Zyndram took part in the military campaign against the Teutonic Order. The following year, he was yet again called to arms and took part in several battles against the Order in Lithuania and northern Poland.

Zyndram was ordered to organize the defense of a nodal castle of Kamieniec Litewski, east of the Białowieża Forest. Probably for successfully fulfilling this task, he was promoted to the starost of Jasło. In 1409, Zyndram was called to arms by king Władysław II Jagiełło to take part in his offensive against the Teutons. During the famous Battle of Grunwald of 1410, Zyndram was the Grand Camp Leader of the Crown and commander of the Banner of Kraków, composed of elite troops and holding the banner of the whole army. According to Historiæ Polonicæ by Ioannes Longinus, it was the unit commanded by Zyndram that killed the Teutonic commander, Ulrich von Jungingen. For many years, it was also believed that he was commander of all Polish troops in the battle, but recent research proved that this was but a wrong translation of Longinus' chronicle. His part in the battle was also described by Henryk Sienkiewicz in his novel The Teutonic Knights.

After the campaign, Zyndram returned to his domain. In 1413, he extended his domain by renting the village of Przesiecznica from the bishop of Przemyśl in exchange for the defense of the area against the Tartars and bandits from the Beskids. The exact date of his death is unknown, however on 5 June 1414 his wife, Anna, was mentioned as "Widow of Zyndram".

See also
 Offices in Polish-Lithuanian Commonwealth
 Zyndram's Hill

External links

Polish generals
Polish knights
1355 births
1414 deaths
People in the Battle of Grunwald